Paired box protein Pax-6, also known as aniridia type II protein (AN2) or oculorhombin, is a protein that in humans is encoded by the PAX6 gene.

Function 

PAX6 is a member of the Pax gene family which is responsible for carrying the genetic information that will encode the Pax-6 protein. It acts as a "master control" gene for the development of eyes and other sensory organs, certain neural and epidermal tissues as well as other homologous structures, usually derived from ectodermal tissues. However, it has been recognized that a suite of genes is necessary for eye development, and therefore the term of "master control" gene may be inaccurate.  Pax-6 is expressed as a transcription factor when neural ectoderm receives a combination of weak Sonic hedgehog (SHH) and strong TGF-Beta signaling gradients. Expression is first seen in the forebrain, hindbrain, head ectoderm and spinal cord followed by later expression in midbrain.  This transcription factor is most noted for its use in the interspecifically induced expression of ectopic eyes and is of medical importance because heterozygous mutants produce a wide spectrum of ocular defects such as aniridia in humans.

Pax6 serves as a regulator in the coordination and pattern formation required for differentiation and proliferation to successfully take place, ensuring that the processes of neurogenesis and oculogenesis are carried out successfully. As a transcription factor, Pax6 acts at the molecular level in the signaling and formation of the central nervous system. The characteristic paired DNA binding domain of Pax6 utilizes two DNA-binding domains, the paired domain (PD), and the paired-type homeodomain (HD). These domains function separately via utilization by Pax6 to carry out molecular signaling that regulates specific functions of Pax6. An example of this lies in HD's regulatory involvement in the formation of the lens and retina throughout oculogenesis contrasted by the molecular mechanisms of control exhibited on the patterns of neurogenesis in brain development by PD.  The HD and PD domains act in close coordination, giving Pax6 its multifunctional nature in directing molecular signaling in formation of the CNS. Although many functions of Pax6 are known, the molecular mechanisms of these functions remain largely unresolved. High-throughput studies uncovered many new target genes of the Pax6 transcription factors during lens development. They include the transcriptional activator BCL9, recently identified, together with Pygo2, to be downstream effectors of Pax6 functions.

Species distribution 

PAX6 protein function is highly conserved across bilaterian species.  For instance, mouse PAX6 can trigger eye development in Drosophila melanogaster.  Additionally, mouse and human PAX6 have identical amino acid sequences.

Genomic organisation of the PAX6 locus varies among species, including the number and distribution of exons, cis-regulatory elements, and transcription start sites, although most elements at the Vertebrata clade do line up with each other. The first work on genomic organisation was performed in quail, but the picture of the mouse locus is the most complete to date.  This consists of 3 confirmed promoters (P0, P1, Pα), 16 exons, and at least 6 enhancers.  The 16 confirmed exons are numbered 0 through 13 with the additions of exon α located between exons 4 and 5, and the alternatively spliced exon 5a.  Each promoter is associated with its own proximal exon (exon 0 for P0, exon 1 for P1) resulting in transcripts which are alternatively spliced in the 5' un-translated region. By convention, exon for orthologs from other species are named relative to the human/mouse numbering, as long as the organization is reasonably well-conserved.

Of the four Drosophila Pax6 orthologues, it is thought that the eyeless (ey) and twin of eyeless (toy) gene products share functional homology with the vertebrate canonical Pax6 isoform, while the eyegone (eyg) and twin of eyegone (toe) gene products share functional homology with the vertebrate Pax6(5a) isoform.  Eyeless and eyegone were named for their respective mutant phenotypes. These paralogs also play a role in the development in the entire eye-antennal disc, and consequently in head formation. toy positively regulates ey expression.

Isoforms 

The vertebrate PAX6 locus encodes at least three different protein isoforms, these being the canonical PAX6, PAX6(5a), and PAX6(ΔPD).  The canonical PAX6 protein contains an N-terminal paired domain, connected by a linker region to a paired-type homeodomain, and a proline/serine/threonine (P/S/T)-rich C-terminal domain.  The paired domain and paired-type homeodomain each have DNA binding activities, while the P/S/T-rich domain possesses a transactivation function.  PAX6(5a) is a product of the alternatively spliced exon 5a resulting in a 14 residue insertion in the paired domain which alters the specificity of this DNA binding activity.  The nucleotide sequence corresponding to the linker region encodes a set of three alternative translation start codons from which the third PAX6 isoform originates.  Collectively known as the PAX6(ΔPD) or pairedless isoforms, these three gene products all lack a paired domain.  The pairedless proteins possess molecular weights of 43, 33, or 32kDa, depending on the particular start codon used. PAX6 transactivation function is attributed to the variable length C-terminal P/S/T-rich domain which stretches to 153 residues in human and mouse proteins.

Clinical significance 
Experiments in mice demonstrate that a deficiency in Pax-6 leads to decrease in brain size, brain structure abnormality leading to Autism, lack of iris formation or a thin cornea. Knockout experiments produced eyeless phenotypes reinforcing indications of the gene's role in eye development.

Mutations 
During embryological development the PAX6 gene, found on chromosome 2 in mice, can be seen expressed in multiple early structures such as the spinal cord, hindbrain, forebrain and eyes. Mutations of the PAX6 gene in mammalian species can produce a drastic effect on the phenotype of the organism. This can be seen in mice that contain homozygous mutations of the 422 amino acid long transcription factor encoded by PAX6 in which they do not develop eyes or nasal cavities termed ‘small eye’ mice (PAX10sey/sey). Deletion of PAX6 induces the same abnormal phenotypes indicating that mutations cause the protein to lose functionality. PAX6 is essential is the formation of the retina, lens and cornea due to its role in early cell determination when forming precursors of these structures such as the optic vesicle and overlying surface ectoderm.  PAX10 mutations also hinder nasal cavity development due to the similar precursor structures that in small eye mice do not express PAX10 mRNA. Mice lacking any functional pax6 begin to be phenotypically differentiable from normal mouse embryos at about day 9 to 10 of gestation. The full elucidation of the precise mechanisms and molecular components by which the PAX6 gene influences eye, nasal and central nervous system development are still researched however, the study of PAX6 has brought more understanding to the development and genetic complexities of these mammalian body systems.

See also 
Aniridia
 Gillespie syndrome

References

Further reading

External links 
 
  GeneReviews/NCBI/NIH/UW entry on Anophthalmia / Microphthalmia Overview
  GeneReviews/NCBI/NIH/UW entry on Aniridia  
  OMIM entries on Aniridia
 Gene Expression Patterns from the Allen Brain Atlases
 

Developmental genes and proteins